James Jerome Belden (September 30, 1825 – January 1, 1904) was an American politician and a U.S. Representative from New York.

Biography
Born in Fabius, New York, Belden was the son of Royal Denison Belding and Olive Cadwell and attended the common schools. He married Mary Anna Gere and they had a daughter, Harriet Anna Belden. He lived in the luxurious Belden House at 620 W. Genesee St. in Syracuse.

Career
After completing his education in local schools, Belden worked in a Jefferson County store to learn bookkeeping and accounting. He went into banking in Syracuse, New York, in 1880. Later he was active in construction, completing many railroads and public works projects. He was also President of the company that published the Syracuse Post and was a hotel owner. In 1877 and 1878, he served as mayor of Syracuse, New York. Among his activities as mayor, he formed a committee of citizens to look after the interests of St. Joseph's Hospital. He later left the hospital a bequest of $50,000.

Belden was elected as a Republican to the Fiftieth Congress to fill the vacancy caused by the resignation of Frank Hiscock, who had been elected to the office of United States Senator.

Reelected to the Fifty-first and Fifty-second Congresses, Belden served as U. S. Representative for the twenty-fifth district of New York from November 8, 1887, to March 3, 1893. He was then elected for the Fifty-third Congress and served as U. S. Representative for the twenty-seventh district of New York from March 4, 1893, to March 3, 1895. He was not a candidate for renomination in 1894.

Again elected to the Fifty-fifth Congress, Belden served as U. S. Representative for the twenty-seventh district of New York from March 4, 1897, to March 3, 1899. He was not a candidate for renomination in 1898, but retired to Syracuse.

Death
Belden died, of uremic poisoning, in Syracuse, New York, on January 1, 1904 (age 78 years, 93 days). He is interred at Oakwood Cemetery (Syracuse, New York). When he died, he was Syracuse's richest citizen with his wealth being estimated at $10 million ($330 million in 2022 dollars), according to an obituary in The Sheffield Observer on January 7, 1914.

References

External links

1825 births
1904 deaths
People from Fabius, New York
Burials at Oakwood Cemetery (Syracuse, New York)
Mayors of Syracuse, New York
Republican Party members of the United States House of Representatives from New York (state)
19th-century American politicians